WLMF-LD (channel 53) is a low-powered television station licensed to Miami, Florida. Founded in 1987 by Paging Systems, Inc., a company based in Burlingame, California, WLMF aired programs from the first channel of SCOLA, a service offering European television news and information. Currently, WLMF is owned by America CV Network as an affiliate of LATV.

WLMF moved from channel 53 to channel 51 upon transitioning to digital broadcasting, and has an application for a low-powered digital service that would air on channel 39. Earlier attempts to move to channel 3 were dismissed. The move to channel 51 was required because channels 52 through 59 were discontinued as part of the 2009 digital television transition and sold off as blocks of UHF spectrum.

Sale to America CV
On February 8, 2021, the station was sold to America CV Station Group and became a sister station to flagship stations WJAN-CD and WFUN-LD.

External links

LMF-LD
Educational and instructional television channels
Low-power television stations in the United States
Television channels and stations established in 1987